The Melting Pot is a play by Israel Zangwill, first staged in 1908. It depicts the life of a Russian Jewish immigrant family, the Quixanos. David Quixano has survived a pogrom, which killed his mother and sister, and he wishes to forget this horrible event. He composes an "American Symphony" and wants to look forward to a society free of ethnic divisions and hatred, rather than backward at his traumatic past.

Plot
David Quixano emigrates to America in the wake of the 1903 Chișinău pogrom in which his entire family is killed. He writes a great symphony called "The Crucible" expressing his hope for a world in which all ethnicity has melted away, and falls in love with a beautiful Russian Christian immigrant named Vera. The dramatic peak of the play is the moment when David meets Vera's father, who turns out to be the Russian officer responsible for the annihilation of David's family. Vera's father admits his guilt, the symphony is performed to accolades, David and Vera agree to wed and kiss as the curtain falls.

Title
David, the hero, proclaims:

Although the idea of "melting" as a metaphor for ethnic assimilation had been used before, Zangwill's play popularized the term "melting pot" as a symbol for this occurrence in American society.

Early productions
The Melting Pot opened in Washington, DC, at the Columbia Theatre, on October 5, 1908.  President Theodore Roosevelt, in attendance that night, is said to have shouted "That's a great play, Mr. Zangwill." It opened at the Comedy Theatre in New York on September 6, 1909, and ran for 136 performances. It was produced by Liebler & Co. and staged (directed) by Hugh Ford.  As in the original production, Walker Whiteside played David, Henry Vogel played Herr Pappelmeister and Chrystal Herne (daughter of James A. Herne) played Vera.

Revival
The play received a production at New York's Metropolitan Playhouse in March 2006.

The play was performed at the Finborough Theatre, London, in December 2017. It was the first UK production of The Melting Pot since 1938.

References

Sources
 Edna Nahshon, From the Ghetto to the Melting Pot: Israel Zangwill's Jewish Plays (Wayne State University Press), 2006.

External links

 

1908 plays
British plays
Works about immigration to the United States